Barry John Everitt FRS, FMedSci, ScD, was Master of Downing College, Cambridge and is Professor of Behavioural Neuroscience and director of research at the University of Cambridge. Since 2013 he is Provost of the Gates Cambridge Trust at Cambridge University.

Education
Everitt graduated in zoology and psychology at the University of Hull and received his PhD degree from the University of Birmingham on behavioural neuroendocrinology. He undertook post-doctoral research at Birmingham and then at the Karolinska Institute in Stockholm, with the neuroanatomists Tomas Hökfelt and Kjell Fuxe.

Research
Everitt's research has spanned many aspects of brain function, from neuroanatomy to neuroendocrinology and behavioural neuroscience. He is an acknowledged international authority on the neural systems underlying learning, memory and motivation especially in relation to drug addiction and in the top 1% most cited researchers in behavioural neuroscience.

Everitt was appointed to the Department of Anatomy at the University of Cambridge in 1974, became a Fellow of Downing College in 1976 and was a Director of Studies for the College from 1979 to 1999. In 1994 he was appointed a Reader in the Department of Experimental Psychology and in 1997 was elected Professor of Behavioural Neuroscience.

Awards and honours
He has served on several national and international advisory committees and has been president of the British Association for Psychopharmacology, the European Brain and Behaviour Society and the European Behavioural Pharmacology Society. He served as President of the Federation of European Neuroscience Societies (FENS) from 2016 to 2018. He is an elected Fellow of the Royal Society, Fellow of the Academy of Medical Sciences, member of the European Molecular Biology Organisation, and received honorary D.Sc. degrees from his almae matres, Birmingham University and Hull University. In 2015 he was awarded the degree of honorary Doctor of Medicine (MDhc) by the Karolinska Institutet in Stockholm. Everitt has been editor-in-chief of the European Journal of Neuroscience and is a reviewing editor for Science. He has received the American Psychological Association "Distinguished Scientific Contribution Award" (2011), the European Behavioural Pharmacology Society "Distinguished Achievement Award" (2011), the Federation of European Neuroscience Societies European Journal of Neuroscience (FENS-EJN) Award (2012), the British Association of Psychopharmacology Lifetime Achievement Award (2012), and the Fondation Ipsen Neuronal Plasticity Prize (2014). In October 2019 he began his term as President of the Society for Neuroscience, the first President from outside North America in its 50 year history, at the beginning of the Society's 50th anniversary year.

References

External links 

British neuroscientists
Masters of Downing College, Cambridge
Fellows of Downing College, Cambridge
Fellows of the Royal Society
Fellows of the Academy of Medical Sciences (United Kingdom)
1946 births
Living people
Behavioral neuroscientists
Academic journal editors
English magazine editors
Place of birth missing (living people)
Alumni of the University of Hull
Alumni of the University of Birmingham